Tian Hui-1 (also known as Mapping Satellite I) is a Chinese earth observation satellite built by Dong Feng Hong, a China Aerospace Science and Technology Corporation (CASC).

According to the Chinese Ministry of Defense the new satellite carries scientific experiments and is to be used for the evaluation of ground resources and mapping.

Tian Hui 1 is equipped with two different camera systems in the visible and infrared range. The visible light camera is able to produce three-dimensional pictures in the spectral region between 510 and 690 nanometers with a dissolution of approximately 5 meters and a field of view of approximately 25 degrees. The infrared camera reaches a dissolution of approximately 10 meters and covers four wavelengths (430 - 520 Nm, 520 - 610 Nm, 610 - 690 Nm and 760 - 900 Nm).

References 

Spacecraft launched in 2012
Satellites of China
Earth observation satellites
Spacecraft launched by Long March rockets